Olifant (an alternate spelling of the word elephant) was the name applied in the Middle Ages to ivory hunting horns made from elephants' tusks. One of the most famous olifants belonged to the legendary Frankish knight Roland, protagonist of The Song of Roland.

In The Song of Roland, Roland carries his olifant while serving on the rearguard of Charlemagne's army. When they are attacked at the Battle of Roncevaux, Oliver tells Roland to use it to call for aid, but he refuses. Roland finally relents, but the battle is already lost. He tries to destroy the olifant along with his sword Durendal, lest they fall into enemy hands. In the end, Roland blows the horn, but the force required bursts his temple, resulting in death. The Karlamagnussaga elaborates (V. c.XIV) that Roland's olifant was a unicorn's horn, hunted in India.

Another famous olifant belonged to Gaston IV, viscount of Béarn, and is now preserved in the Spanish city of Saragossa, which he helped reconquer from the Banu Hud.

Salernitan oliphants
The Horn or Oliphant of Ulph, preserved in the treasury of York Minster, is one of a group that were carved in Salerno in the first half of the eleventh century. In one of its bands of low-relief carving, addorsed paired griffons have tails that terminate in monstrous eared heads.

The horn of Ulph is most likely the very Horn of Tenure given to York Minster by the Viking nobleman Ulph, who resided in Yorkshire before the reign of Edward the Confessor; thus the Horn of Ulph cannot be dated later than the first half of the eleventh century.

A group of surviving ivory horns carved with bands of low relief have been attributed to the same Salerno workshops as the Oliphant of Ulph: the oliphant of the Chartreuse de Portes, an oliphant in the Boston Museum of Fine Arts, the horn of Muri Abbey conserved in Vienna, and oliphants from the treasury of the Basilica of St. Sernin, Toulouse, and Saragossa Cathedral.

Depictions in Fiction 
In Washington Irving's 1809 fictional A History of New York, the trumpter Anthony Van Corlaer blows a mock-heroic last blast of warning before drowning in Spuyten Duyvil Creek.

The Horn of Gondor, held by Boromir, from Tolkien's Lord of the Rings seems to have been based on the Medieval Olifant. There is a connection to the Song of Roland in the novels and movies, when Boromir blows the horn at the battle of Amon Hen to try to summon help from the other members of the Fellowship of the Ring. For Boromir, like Roland, this action comes too late, as he is mortally wounded with several arrows shot by an Orc archer by the time Aragorn and the others reach him.

The horn was later presented  to Denethor, Steward of Gondor as proof of his son's death. In the movie of The Return of the King, he holds the horn, now split in two, and demands an explanation for what happened from the wizard Gandalf.

Queen Susan's horn in the Chronicles of Narnia series also resembles an Olifant, and it was said that whenever it was blown "help would certainly come" to whoever had blown it. Queen Susan blows it to summon assistance in The Lion the Witch and the Wardrobe, and later uses it as a hunting horn. In Prince Caspian it magically summons the four Pevensie children back to Narnia when it is blown by the young Caspian.

References

External links 
 

Early musical instruments
Ivory works of art
Matter of France
Medieval art
Natural horns and trumpets
The Song of Roland